Dariusz Gajewski (born 3 December 1964, Częstochowa) is a Polish film director and screenwriter.

He graduated from the National Film School in Łódź in 1993. He also studied law at the Jagiellonian University in Kraków. His 2003 film Warszawa ("Warsaw") won the Golden Lions Award at the 28th Gdynia Film Festival. Between 2008–2016, he was the chairman of the Andrzej Munk Film Studio Młodzi i Film. Since 2016, he has served as deputy director of the Polish Filmmakers Association.

In 2004, he married actress Agnieszka Grochowska.

Filmography
Nie bój, nie bój (1994)
Utwór na chłopca i lampę (1996)
Franciszek muzykant (1998)
Anatol lubi podróże (1999)
Stara muzyka (1999)
Konwój (1999)
Tu jest wszystko (2000)
AlaRm (2002)
Warszawa (2003)
Lekcje pana Kuki (2007)
Obce niebo (2015)
Czas niedokończony. Wiersze księdza Jana Twardowskiego (2015)
Legiony (2019)

See also
Polish cinema
List of Poles

References

Living people
1964 births
Polish film directors
Polish screenwriters
People from Częstochowa
Łódź Film School alumni